Genius Loci and Other Tales is a collection of fantasy, horror and science fiction short stories by American writer Clark Ashton Smith. It was released in 1948 and was the author's third book published by Arkham House.  It was released in an edition of 3,047 copies.  The stories were written between 1930 and 1935.

The collection contains stories from Smith's major story cycles of Averoigne and Zothique.

Contents

Genius Loci and Other Tales contains the following stories:

"Genius Loci"
"The Willow Landscape"
"The Ninth Skeleton"
"The Phantoms of the Fire"
"The Eternal World"
"Vulthoom"
"A Star-Change"
"The Primal City"
"The Disinterment of Venus"
 "The Colossus of Ylourgne"
 "The Satyr"
"The Garden of Adompha"
"The Charnel God"
 "The Black Abbot of Puthuum"
 "The Weaver in the Vault"

See also
 Clark Ashton Smith bibliography

Sources

1948 short story collections
Fantasy short story collections
Horror short story collections
Science fiction short story collections by Clark Ashton Smith